Ghost Rider is the name of multiple comic book titles featuring the character Ghost Rider and published by Marvel Comics, beginning with the original Ghost Rider comic book series which debuted in 1967.

Publication history

Volume 1
Marvel Comics debuted the character Carter Slade in its western title Ghost Rider #1 (cover-dated Feb. 1967), by writers Roy Thomas and Gary Friedrich and original (1949-1954) Ghost Rider artist Dick Ayers.  The comic lasted seven issues, until Ghost Rider #7 (October 1967).

Volume 1 (Series two)
Following the western title, the first superhero Ghost Rider, Johnny Blaze, received his own series in June 1973, with penciller Jim Mooney handling most of the first nine issues. Several different creative teams mixed-and-matched until penciller Don Perlin began a long stint with issue #26, eventually joined by writer Michael Fleisher through issue #58.

Tony Isabella wrote a two-year story arc in which Blaze occasionally encountered an unnamed character referred to as "the Friend" who helped Blaze stay protected from Satan. Isabella said that with editorial approval he had introduced the character, who "looked sort of like a hippie Jesus Christ and that's exactly who He was, though I never actually called Him that...." At the story arc's climax, Isabella had planned that Blaze "accepts Jesus Christ into his life. This gives him the strength to overcome Satan, though with more pyrotechnics than most of us can muster. He retains the Ghost Rider powers he had been given by Satan, but they are his to use as his new faith directs him." However, Isabella said, Jim Shooter, then an assistant editor, 

Blaze's Ghost Rider career ends when the demon Zarathos, who inhabited Blaze's body as Ghost Rider, flees in issue #81 (June 1983), the finale, in order to pursue the villain named Centurious. Now free of his curse, Blaze goes off to live with Roxanne. Blaze occasionally appeared in the subsequent 1990–1998 series, Ghost Rider, which starred a related character, Daniel Ketch. This series revealed Blaze and Roxanne eventually got married and had two children.

Volume 2
The third Ghost Rider, Danny Ketch, debuted in Ghost Rider vol. 2 #1 (May 1990). The series ended with a cliffhanger in vol. 2 #93 (Feb. 1998). Marvel finally published the long-awaited final issue nine years later as Ghost Rider Finale (Jan. 2007), which reprints vol. 2 #93 and the previously unpublished #94.

In their review of Ghost Rider #80–85, Wizard gave the series their lowest possible rating, citing convoluted, tangential plots, dragged out fight scenes, and inappropriately cartoonish art.

Volume 3
Blaze returned as Ghost Rider in a 2001 six-issue miniseries written by Devin Grayson, Ghost Rider #1–6 (August 2001 – January 2002).

Collected in the Hammer Road? -titled collected edition.

Volume 4 
Johnny Blaze's continued journeys as chronicled in a six-issue limited series written by Garth Ennis, Ghost Rider: Road to Damnation.

Volume 5
Johnny Blaze appeared as Ghost Rider in an ongoing monthly series that began publication with Ghost Rider #1 (September 2006) and ran until Ghost Rider #35 (July 2009).

Series 6 Ghost Riders: Heaven's on Fire 
Johnny Blaze's story begun with "The Road to Damnation" and continued within Ghost Rider volume 5 comes to a close with the series Ghost Riders: Heaven's on Fire, which ran for six issues.

Ghost Rider: Trail of Tears~ 
A prequel to his "Ghost Rider: The Road to Damnation" story, it was penned by Clayton Crane and drawn and scripted with Garth Ennis.

Volume 6
The sixth series to bear the name debuted with Ghost Rider #1 (September 2011) and ended with Ghost Rider #9 (May 2012).

All-New Ghost Rider (Robbie Reyes) Volume 1 
The new host of the Spirit of Vengeance, Robbie Reyes makes his debut in Marvel Comics within this 12-issue series.

Ghost Racers Volume 1 
Four-issue cross-over miniseries tie-in during the massive Secret Wars super-event.

Volume 7 
The seventh volume consisted of one single resolution story to Robbie Reyes' relatively brief time as the Ghost Rider.  This miniseries had five issues included.

Volume 8 
This series featured both Johnny Blaze and Danny Ketch as the infamous Spirits of Vengeance. It lasted for seven issues.

Entries 13 & 14~ 
Ghost Rider: Return of Vengeance #1, a one-shot special, was released in February 2021. 

Soon after, the crossover event one-shot King in Black: Ghost Rider #1 was released in May 2021.

Volume 9 
Johnny Blaze returns post-King in Black with a scoured memory and hunting down demons in the American West while Agent Warroad accompanies the F.B.I. in steady pursuit.

Entry 16~ 
Ghost Rider: Vengeance Forever #1 released in ~August 2022 between issues #4 and 5 of Volume 9.

Collected editions
Essential Ghost Rider Vol. 1 (trade paperback,  2005; reprints Marvel Spotlight # 5–12, Ghost Rider vol. 2 #1–20 and Daredevil #138)
Essential Ghost Rider Vol. 2 (trade paperback, 2007; reprints Ghost Rider vol. 2 #21–50)
Essential Ghost Rider Vol. 3 (trade paperback, 2009; reprints Ghost Rider vol. 2 #51–65, Avengers #214, Marvel Two-In-One #80)
Essential Ghost Rider Vol. 4 (trade paperback, 2010; reprints Ghost Rider vol. 2 #66–81, Amazing Spider-Man #274 and New Defenders #145 and 146)
Ghost Rider Team-Up (trade paperback, 2007 ; reprints Marvel Team-Up #91, Marvel Two-in-One #80, Marvel Premiere #28, Avengers #214 and Ghost Rider vol. 2 #27 & #50)
Ghost Rider: Resurrected (trade paperback, 1991; reprints Ghost Rider vol. 3, #1–7)
Ghost Rider: Danny Ketch Classic Vol. 1 (trade paperback, 2009; reprints Ghost Rider vol. 3, #1–10)
Ghost Rider: Danny Ketch Classic Vol. 2 (trade paperback, 2010; reprints Ghost Rider vol. 3, #11–20)
X-Men & Ghost Rider: Brood Trouble in the Big Easy (trade paperback; 1993; reprints Ghost Rider vol. 3  #26–27 and X-Men #8–9)
Rise of the Midnight Sons (trade paperback, 1992; reprints Ghost Rider vol. 3, #28, 31; Ghost Rider/Blaze: Spirits of Vengeance #1, Morbius #1, Darkhold #1 and Nightstalkers #1)
Spirits of Vengeance: Rise of the Midnight Sons (Trade paperback, 2022; reprints Ghost Rider vol. 3, #28, 31; Ghost Rider/Blaze: Spirits of Vengeance #1-6, Morbius #1, Darkhold #1 Nightstalkers #1, Web of Spider-Man #95-96 and material from Midnight Sons Unlimited #1)
Ghost Rider: The Hammer Lane (trade paperback, 2002; reprints Ghost Rider vol. 4 #1–6)
Ghost Rider: Road to Damnation (Hardcover, 2007; reprints Ghost Rider vol. 5 #1–6)
Ghost Rider: Road to Damnation (trade paperback, 2007; reprints Ghost Rider vol. 5 #1–6)
Ghost Rider Vol. 1: Vicious Cycle (trade paperback,  2007; reprints Ghost Rider vol. 6 #1–5)
Ghost Rider Vol. 2: The Life & Death Of Johnny Blaze (trade paperback, 2007; reprints Ghost Rider vol. 6 #6–11)
Ghost Rider Vol. 3: Apocalypse Soon (trade paperback, 2008; reprints Ghost Rider vol. 6 #12–13 and Annual #1)
Ghost Rider Vol. 4: Revelations (trade paperback, 2008; reprints Ghost Rider vol. 6  #14–19)
Ghost Rider Vol. 5: Hell Bent and Heaven Bound (trade paperback, 2008; reprints Ghost Rider vol. 6  #20–25)
Ghost Rider Vol. 6: The Last Stand (trade paperback, 2009; reprints Ghost Rider vol. 6  #26–32)
Ghost Rider Vol. 7: Trials and Tribulations (trade paperback, 2009; reprints Ghost Rider vol. 6  #33–35 and Annual #2)
Ghost Rider: Ultimate Collection by Daniel Way (trade paperback, 2012; reprints Ghost Rider vol. 6 #1–19)
Ghost Rider Omnibus by Jason Aaron (hardcover, 2010; reprints Ghost Rider vol. 6 #20–35 and Ghost Riders: Heaven's on Fire #1–6)
Ghost Rider: Danny Ketch – Addict (Ghost Rider: Danny Ketch #1–5 and Ghost Rider Finale)
Fear Itself: Ghost Rider (trade paperback, Ghost Rider vol. 7 #0.1 & #1–5)
Ghost Rider: The Complete Series by Rob Williams (trade paperback, Ghost Rider vol. 7 #0.1 & #1–9)

References

1967 comics debuts
1967 comics endings
1973 comics debuts
1983 comics endings
1990 comics debuts
1998 comics endings
2001 comics debuts
2002 comics endings
2006 comics debuts
2009 comics endings
Ghost Rider
Marvel Comics titles